Porsanger is a municipality in Troms og Finnmark county, Norway. The administrative centre of the municipality is the village of Lakselv. Other villages in the municipality include Børselv, Brenna, Indre Billefjord, Kistrand, Olderfjord, and Skoganvarre.

The  municipality is the 3rd largest by area out of the 356 municipalities in Norway. Porsanger is the 204th most populous municipality in Norway with a population of 3,904, many of whom have a Kven (Kainu) or Sami background.

General information

The municipality of Kistrand (renamed Porsanger in 1964) was established on 1 January 1838 (see formannskapsdistrikt law). On 1 January 1851, the southern part of Kistrand (population: 869) was separated to become the new Kautokeino Municipality. On 1 January 1861, the northern part of Kistrand (population: 345) was separated to become the new Kjelvik Municipality. On 1 January 1866, the southern part of Kistrand (population: 515) was separated to become the new Karasjok Municipality.

On 1 January 2020, the municipality became part of the newly formed Troms og Finnmark county. Previously, it had been part of the old Finnmark county.

Name
The municipality was originally named Kistrand, after the farm where the main parish church (Kistrand Church) was located. In 1964, the municipality was renamed Porsanger, after the local Porsangerfjorden.

The first element is probably the name of the plant pors or finnmarkspors (Rhododendron tomentosum). Another theory is that is derived from the Northern Sami word  which means "waterfall".

Since 2004, the municipality has had three official names: Porsanger, Porsáŋgu, and Porsanki, since it has three official languages: Norwegian, Northern Sami, and Kven.

Coat of arms
The coat of arms was granted on 16 June 1967. The official blazon is "Gules, three reindeer salient argent". This means the arms have a red field (background) and the charge is three leaping reindeer, two over one. The reindeer have a tincture of argent which means it is commonly colored white, but if it is made out of metal, then silver is used. Porsanger is one of the largest municipalities in the Northern Norway that is not dependent on fishing. Instead, the local people historically farmed reindeer, which is still an importance source of income for the residents. The arms were designed by Hallvard Trætteberg.

Churches
The Church of Norway has one parish within the municipality of Porsanger. It is part of the Indre Finnmark prosti (deanery) in the Diocese of Nord-Hålogaland.

History
The area has been settled by Sami people since time immemorial. In the 18th century, people from Finland, escaping famine and war, settled along the Porsangerfjorden. These people are today known as Kven. Today, three official languages are in use, and the municipality is named Porsanger, Porsáŋgu, and Porsanki (the name in Norwegian, Northern Sami, and Kven/Finnish respectively).

Government
All municipalities in Norway, including Porsanger, are responsible for primary education (through 10th grade), outpatient health services, senior citizen services, unemployment and other social services, zoning, economic development, and municipal roads. The municipality is governed by a municipal council of elected representatives, which in turn elect a mayor.  The municipality falls under the Indre Finnmark District Court and the Hålogaland Court of Appeal.

Municipal council
The municipal council  of Porsanger is made up of 19 representatives that are elected to four year terms. The party breakdown of the council is as follows:

Mayors
The mayors of Porsanger:

1839-1841: Søren Von Krogh Zetlitz
1841-1847: Johan Eirik Greiner
1847-1849: Peder K. Ulich
1849-1857: Johan Eirik Greiner
1857-1861: Peter Valeur
1861-1865: Johan Eirik Greiner
1869-1873: Lorents Jacob Pauli Holmgren
1873-1876: Lars Anton Moe
1877-1879: Thorvald Egeberg
1879-1881: Johan Eirik Greiner
1881-1885: Peder Larsen
1885-1894: Jacob A. Nordang
1894-1895: Anton Bye
1896-1897: Karl J Smith
1898-1901: Anton Bye
1902-1904: Salomon Nilsen
1905-1907: Nils Christoffersen
1908-1909: Peder Sætrum
1909-1911: Johannes Rasmussen
1911-1913: Anton Bye
1914-1917: Peder Andreas Olsen
1917-1919: H. Wilhelmsen
1920–1922: Peder Andreas Olsen 	
1923–1925: Georg Bjørkli 
1926–1931: Olaf Reiersen 
1932–1941: Peder Sivertsen (Ap)
1945-1945: Hans A. Opstad (Ap)
1945–1951: Peder Sivertsen (Ap)
1952–1967: Hans A. Opstad (Ap)
1968–1975: Helmer Mikkelsen (Ap)
1976–1983: Hans A. Karlsen (LL)
1984–1987: Steinulf Isaksen (Ap)
1988–1989: Aina Hanssen (Ap)
1990–1991: Berit Oppegaard (H)
1992–1995: Åsla Eriksen (Ap)
1995–1999: Rolf I. Johansen (Ap)
1999–2007: Bjørn Søderholm (H)
2007–2011: Mona Skanke (Ap)
2011–2015: Knut Roger Hanssen (H)
2015–present: Aina Borch (Ap)

Economy

Lakselv Airport, Banak is located on the Banak peninsula, just north of Lakselv village, along the coast of the fjord. The airport has connections to Tromsø and Kirkenes and it is operated by Widerøe. There are also charter flights in the summer season. The airport is also used by the Royal Norwegian Air Force's Station Group Banak. The Norwegian Army also has a garrison at Porsangermoen (Garrison of Porsanger), and so the military presence in Porsanger is quite heavy.

The local newspapers are Finnmark Dagblad and Ságat. The northernmost winery is located here, using crowberries instead of grapes.

Geography

The municipality surrounds the inner part of the Porsangerfjorden, the fourth longest fjord in Norway and the longest in Northern Norway.

The Porsangerfjorden is a wide, open body of water with many islands. The Porsanger Peninsula lies on the western shore of the fjord and the Sværholt Peninsula lies on the eastern shore. The biggest village (and municipal centre) is the village of Lakselv at the fjord's southern end. There are many smaller villages spread around the fjord on both sides, notably Kistrand, Olderfjord, Børselv, and Indre Billefjord.

Stabbursdalen National Park, with the world's northernmost pine forest, lies just west of the fjord and the village of Lakselv. The Stabburselva river runs through the park. Other notable rivers include the Børselva and Lakselva, both are well known for their salmon fishing. The lakes Gákkajávri and Kjæsvannet are both located in the municipality.

In Porsanger, there is midnight sun from 16 May until 27 July each year and there is polar night from 25 November to 16 January.

Birdlife
Porsanger is an area of rich and varied bird fauna. Here one can find such species as pine grosbeak. Away from the woodlands, it is the surrounding wetlands that have the greatest diversity. During spring, thousands of red knots stop to rest and feed along the shores of Porsangerfjord.

Climate
Lakselv has a boreal climate with modest precipitation and long winters, but still with annual mean well above freezing, ensuring there is no permafrost. The winters are less severe in terms of cold than would be expected for a town at 70 degrees latitude. The all-time high temperature  was recorded on 5 July 2021. This is the warmest temperature ever recorded north of 70 degrees North in Europe. The all-time low  is from January 1986. The average date for the last overnight freeze (low below ) in spring is 24 May and average date for first freeze in autumn is 6 September giving a frost-free season of 105 days. 
The weather station (recording since Aug 1945) is located at Banak Airport,  from the town.

Notable people 
 John Persen (1941–2014) a Norwegian composer, he grew up in Ráigeadja 
 Synnøve Persen (born 1950 in Beavgohpis) a Norwegian Sámi artist, author and activist
 Ivar Thomassen (1954 in Russenes – 2016) a Norwegian folk singer, songwriter and jazz pianist
 Arnljot Elgsæter (born 1944 in Kistrand) a physicist and academic
 Kåre Olli (born 1959) a Sami Arbeiderparti politician

References

External links

Municipal fact sheet from Statistics Norway 
Activities & tourism in Porsanger
Stabbursnes nature house and museum
Angling in Porsanger

 
Municipalities of Troms og Finnmark
Populated places of Arctic Norway
1838 establishments in Norway
Kven language municipalities
Sámi-language municipalities